Ron, Ronald or Ronnie Mitchell may refer to:

Sportspeople
 Fang Mitchell (born 1948 as Ronald L. Mitchell), American college basketball coach
 Ron Mitchell (coach) (born 1938), American football and basketball coach
 Ronald Mitchell (1902 – after 1930), English footballer

Others
 Andrew Ronald Mitchell (1921–2007), British mathematician
 Ronnie Mitchell, fictional female character in EastEnders

See also
 
 
 
 Mitchell (surname)